Seticosta elbaho is a species of moth of the family Tortricidae. It is found in Venezuela.

The wingspan is 33 mm. The ground colour of the wings is brown. The basal area is crossed by four short lines and the dorsal area is separated by an almost straight line. The hindwings are dirty cream, strigulated (finely streaked) with brownish.

Etymology
The species name refers to the type locality, El Baho in Venezuela.

References

Moths described in 2013
Seticosta